Justin Tyler McElroy (born November 8, 1980) is an American podcaster, comedian, and former video game journalist. He is known for his work on podcasts (such as My Brother, My Brother and Me, The Adventure Zone, and Sawbones) and as the co-founder of video game journalism website Polygon.

Early and personal life
McElroy was born in 1980 to Clint McElroy, former co-host of WTCR-FM's morning radio show in Huntington, West Virginia, and his wife Leslie. McElroy attended Marshall University, and lives in Huntington . He has been married to Dr. Sydnee Smirl McElroy since 2006. They have two children: Charlie Gail “Chuck” McElroy, born on August 12, 2014, and Cooper Renee McElroy, born on February 13, 2018.

Career

Journalism
McElroy worked for the Ironton Tribune as a reporter from 2005, covering Ohio University Southern, the Ironton and Coal Grove areas and feature stories. After becoming news editor for the paper he then worked at Joystiq as a journalist from 2007 to 2012. During this time, he was the producer of the Joystiq podcast.

In 2012, McElroy co-founded Polygon, a video game website, along with his brother Griffin and Christopher Grant, and was formerly an editor-at-large at said website. In 2018, Justin and Griffin both announced their departure from Polygon, in order to focus on their podcasting careers and families.

Podcasting
Since 2010, Justin McElroy has co-hosted the comedy podcast My Brother, My Brother and Me along with his brothers Griffin and Travis. The podcast began in 2010 as a form of "self-entertainment" before it was added to the Maximum Fun network. The podcast takes the form of a humorous "advice show", in which the brothers answer questions that have been directly submitted by listeners, as well as questions that listeners have found on Yahoo! Answers. In 2010, the show was consistently listed among the top 10 comedy podcasts on iTunes, and it has received positive critical reception. The podcast was later turned into a 2017 television show, which originally aired on Seeso and now streams on VRV.

Since June 21, 2013, Justin and his wife Sydnee have co-hosted the podcast Sawbones, a "marital tour of misguided medicine" and a humorous exploration of medical history, focusing on the many ways the medical community has been wrong in the past. A book based on this podcast, The Sawbones Book: The Horrifying, Hilarious Road To Modern Medicine, was published by Weldon Owen on October 9, 2018.

In 2014, the McElroy brothers launched a tabletop role-playing game podcast entitled The Adventure Zone. Initially focusing on Dungeons & Dragons, the show began to explore other game systems in later seasons. During the first campaign, subtitled Balance, Justin McElroy portrays Taako, an elf wizard. In the second campaign, Amnesty, Justin portrays Wayne "Duck" Newton, a forest ranger. In the third campaign, Graduation, he portrayed an unnamed Firbolg student. Justin plays a monk named Amber Gris in the fourth campaign, Ethersea.

The first sub-arc of The Adventure Zone: Balance, named Here There Be Gerblins, was later adapted into a graphic novel in cooperation with artist Carey Pietsch, and was published by First Second Books in 2018. The book topped The New York Times' best-selling trade fiction list, becoming the first graphic novel to do so. It was followed by a second graphic novel, Murder on the Rockport Limited!, in 2019, a third installment, Petals to the Metal, in 2020, a fourth, The Crystal Kingdom, in 2021, and a fifth installment, The Eleventh Hour, in 2023. 

Justin and his brothers also co-host a yearly podcast with Tim Batt and Guy Montgomery, released every American Thanksgiving since 2015, called 'Til Death Do Us Blart where they review the film Paul Blart: Mall Cop 2. The brothers also host the documentary podcast The McElroy Brothers Will Be in Trolls World Tour, which ultimately resulted in the announcement that all three were set to make cameo appearances in the film.

In 2018, Justin McElroy launched The Empty Bowl, a "meditative podcast about cereal" with Dan Goubert, writer of the Cerealously blog.

Other programs

Beginning in 2015, Justin and his brother Griffin began hosting a gaming comedy show for Polygon called Monster Factory. The series—in which the two use powerful character creation tools from popular video and computer games to create hideous characters—was praised by The Mary Sue as one of the "funniest series on YouTube". The series briefly went on hiatus after the pair left Polygon, but resumed output in December 2018.

Justin appeared with his brothers on the July 24, 2017, episode of @midnight, during which host Chris Hardwick publicly acknowledged that @midnight was ending.

Justin has appeared twice as a guest on The George Lucas Talk Show, once during the May the 4th, 2020 fundraiser The George Lucas Talk Show All Day Star Wars Movie Watch Along, and later on the December 22, 2020, episode The George Lucas Holiday Special.

Voice acting
McElroy has appeared as a voice actor in several animated TV shows. In 2017, he appeared as Billiam Milliam in the animated comedy series OK K.O.! Let's Be Heroes. In 2018, he appeared in the Cartoon Hangover-produced animated mini-series Slug Riot. He also provided voice commentary for the 2017 video game 100ft Robot Golf, along with Griffin and Travis.
In September 2018, following a successful podcasting campaign, Justin and his brothers confirmed that they would be voicing the character Skyscraper in the film Trolls World Tour, with Justin also voicing Techno Drop Button and Tumbleweed.

Awards and achievements
In 2006, McElroy received an award for the best business reporting in Ohio from the Associated Press in recognition of his work with the Ironton Tribune. In 2009, McElroy received a Shorty Award in the video games category.

In 2021, a newly discovered species of millipede was named Nannaria mcelroyorum in recognition of the McElroy family's podcasts, which entertained the scientists during their field work. The millipede is found in West Virginia as well as the wider Appalachian region.

In 2021, McElroy added the "Berries and Cream" sound from a 2007 Starburst commercial to the video-sharing app TikTok, which has since been used in 354.1K videos.

References

1980 births
Living people
21st-century American journalists
21st-century American male writers
American male journalists
American male voice actors
American media critics
American online journalists
American podcasters
Journalists from West Virginia
McElroy family
Video game critics
Writers from Huntington, West Virginia
Shorty Award winners